Lenize Potgieter (born 2 May 1994) is a South African professional netball player who currently plays for Manchester Thunder and the South African national team.

Early life
Potgieter was born in Polokwane, Limpopo before moving to Pretoria to pursue her high school career at Hoërskool Menlopark and further her studies and netball career. She has played netball for the past seventeen years.

Career
Lenize has represented her province of Limpopo at respective provincial netball tournaments. She played for the Gauteng Jaguars in the Brutal Fruit Netball Cup for three years as well as represented her university in the local varsity championship. Also, she earned her first international cap in the 2014 Commonwealth Games. Potgieter was also in the Spar Proteas squad that competed against the Silver Ferns in the Taini Jamieson Trophy whereby she displayed some excellent netball and earned the MVP award despite the Spar Proteas losing to the world ranked number two. She also got selected to represent her country at the 2015 Netball World Cup in Sydney, Australia whereby the Spar Proteas finished in fifth. The following year she got signed by Team Bath in the Netball Superleague before being snapped up by Waikato Bay of Plenty Magic of the ANZ Premiership in 2017. She stayed at Waikato for two seasons before moving to Southern Steel ahead of the 2019 season. At the end of the 2019 ANZ Premiership season, Potgieter was signed by the Queensland Firebirds as an injury replacement player for the rest of the Australian domestic season. On 21 June 2019, it was announced Potgieter will be playing for Adelaide Thunderbirds in the 2020 season.

Potgieter was signed by Netball Super League side Manchester Thunder prior to the start of the 2022 season.

References

South African netball players
1994 births
Living people
Netball Superleague players
Team Bath netball players
2019 Netball World Cup players
South African expatriate netball people in Australia
South African expatriate netball people in England
South African expatriate netball people in New Zealand
ANZ Premiership players
Waikato Bay of Plenty Magic players
Southern Steel players
Queensland Firebirds players
Suncorp Super Netball players
Adelaide Thunderbirds players
2015 Netball World Cup players
Manchester Thunder players